General elections were held in Turks and Caicos Islands on 9 November 2012. The PNP won the election, winning eight seats with the PDM winning seven. The PNP won most of its seats by narrow margins over the PDM, while the PDM won its seats by wide margins over the PNP, with the result that despite winning fewer seats and thereby losing the election, the PDM garnered more overall votes nationwide.

Background
In 2009 the British government had imposed direct rule over the islands after an inquiry discovered evidence of corruption and incompetence in the islands' government. The islands' government was suspended for two years and the British-appointed governor given executive power over the territory.

On 12 June 2012 British Foreign Secretary William Hague announced that fresh elections would be held in November 2012, stating that there had been "significant progress with an ambitious reform programme" and that there had been "sufficient progress, on the milestones and on putting in place robust financial controls"

A new constitution came into force on 15 October 2012. The terms of the election are specified in the constitution.

Electoral system
Following the 2007 elections, the number of single-member constituencies was reduced from 15 to 10. However, an additional five members were elected at-large at the national level, with voters able to vote for up to five at-large candidates. According to a report on 12 October, there were 6,896 verified electors in the Electors Register, with an additional 349 to be published in a supplementary register later.

Candidates
On Nomination Day, 25 October, a total of thirty-seven candidates were officially nominated. Among them were fifteen each from the Progressive National Party (PNP) and the People's Democratic Movement (PDM), five from the newly formed People's Progressive Party (PPP), and two independents.

The below list of candidates comes from the Turks and Caicos Islands Elections Office. Election results were confirmed on November 9, 2012, for local voting districts, and on November 12, 2012, for the at-large seats.

Results

By constituency

Subsequent by-election
PDM candidate Isaac Selver filed an election petition in the Supreme Court regarding the results in Electoral District 7, in which he had lost to Amanda Misick of the PNP by 30 votes. Selver's petition stated that PPP candidate Edward Smith was ineligible to stand for election by reason of his dual citizenship and dual allegiance to the United States and the Turks and Caicos Islands, and that the 58 votes that went to Smith had affected the outcome of the election and could have resulted in Selver's victory over Misick. In a December 2012 interview, Smith claimed that he had renounced U.S. citizenship by taking an oath of allegiance to the Queen in order to take up a position in the Turks and Caicos government. However, he had used his United States passport to travel to the United States in July 2012 after that oath. On 7 February 2013, the Supreme Court ruled the election void. A by-election will be held in late March.

References

Turks and Caicos
General
Elections in the Turks and Caicos Islands
Turks and Caicos
Turks and Caicos